The Manzanares is an 80 km long river in Venezuela. It flows into the Caribbean Sea.

Course
Finally it flows by City of Cumaná into the Cariaco Gulf of the Caribbean.

History
Historically this river had also been known as the 'Cumaná River', for it has an iconic value in the city of Cumaná.

Alexander von Humboldt praised the pleasant atmosphere of the river banks in his travelogue Personal Narrative of a Journey to the Equinoctial Regions of the New Continent (1814–29)

In 2012, Hurricane Isaac caused heavy rain in the area and the Manzanares overflowed its banks in the town of Cumanacoa inundating approximately 1,200 homes many of which were damaged and a few destroyed. Some residents had to be airlifted to safety. Similar flooding occurred elsewhere in the country, such as in Caracas where 40 families had to be evacuated.

This river is the subject of Rio Manzanares, a famous Parang song composed by José Antonio López in Cumaná in 1958.

See also 
 List of rivers of Venezuela
Parang

References

External links 

 Environmental conditions of the waters of the Manzanares River, Cumaná-Sucre, Venezuela
Manzanares, la vuelta al Parque Ayacucho

Rivers of Venezuela
Geography of Sucre (state)